Sheikh Tahnoun bin Zayed bin Khalifa Al Nahyan (1857–1912) was the Ruler of Abu Dhabi from May 1909 to October 1912.

Biography
Tahnoun was born in 1857 and was the second eldest son of Zayed bin Khalifa. Tahnoun's mother was the daughter of Saeed bin Tahnun Al Nahyan.

Tahnoun succeeded his father Zayed bin Khalifa in May 1909 when his elder brother, Khalifa, refused to replace his father. Tahnoun died in October 1912 and was succeeded by his another brother, Hamdan.

References

20th-century rulers in Asia
1857 births
1912 deaths
House of Al Nahyan
Sheikhs of Abu Dhabi